Japanese cheesecake, also known as soufflé-style cheesecake, cotton cheesecake, or light cheesecake, is a variety of cheesecake that is usually lighter in texture and less sweet than North American-style cheesecakes. It has a characteristically wobbly and airy texture, similar to a soufflé when fresh out of the oven and a chiffon cake-like texture when chilled.

The recipe was created by Japanese chef Tomotaro Kuzuno, who was inspired by a local  cheesecake (a German variant) during a trip to Berlin in the 1960s. It is less sweet and has fewer calories than standard Western-style cheesecakes, containing less cheese and sugar. The cake is made with cream cheese, butter, sugar, and eggs. Similar to chiffon cake or soufflé, Japanese cheesecake has a fluffy texture produced by whipping egg white and egg yolk separately. It is traditionally made in a bain-marie.

The cake is the signature dish of Uncle Tetsu's Cheesecake, a Japanese bakery chain which originated in Hakata-ku, Fukuoka, in 1947.

See also
 List of cakes
 Japanese cuisine

References

Custard desserts
Japanese cuisine
Steamed foods
Sponge cakes
Cheesecakes